Leptotrophon coralensis is a species of sea snail, a marine gastropod mollusk in the family Muricidae, the murex snails or rock snails.

Description
The length of the shell attains 9.5 mm.

Distribution
This marine species occurs in the Coral Sea

References

 Houart, R. (1995). The Trophoninae (Gastropoda: Muricidae) of the New Caledonia region. in: Bouchet, P. (Ed.) Résultats des Campagnes MUSORSTOM 14. Mémoires du Muséum national d'Histoire naturelle. Série A, Zoologie. 167: 459–498.

External links
 MNHN, Paris: holotype
 Houart, R.; Héros, V. (2012). New species of Muricidae (Gastropoda) and additional or noteworthy records from the western Pacific. Zoosystema. 34(1), 21-37

Muricidae
Gastropods described in 1995